Labiinae, whose members are commonly known as little earwigs, is a moderately sized family of earwigs in the suborder Forficulina.

Genera
This subfamily includes the following genera:

 Chaetolabia Brindle, 1972
 Circolabia Steinmann, 1987
 Isolabella Verhoeff, 1902
 Labia Leach, 1815
 Paralabella Steinmann, 1990
 Paraspania Steinmann, 1985
 Sphingolabis de Bormans, 1883
 Spirolabia Steinmann, 1987

References

External links
 The Earwig Research Centre's Labiidae database Source for references: type Labiinae in the "subfamily" field and click "search".

Dermaptera subfamilies
Forficulina